Alberto Val (born 6 March 1986, Zaragoza) is a Spanish handballer who plays for CB Ciudad de Logroño.

Achievements
 EHF Champions League:
Winner: 2005
 EHF Champions Trophy:
Winner: 2003
 EHF Cup Winners' Cup:
Semifinalist: 2012
 Liga Națională:
Winner: 2013
 Cupa României:
Winner: 2013
 Supercopa ASOBAL:
Winner: 2004
 King's Cup:
Winner: 2004

References

1986 births
Living people
Sportspeople from Zaragoza
Spanish male handball players
Liga ASOBAL players
FC Barcelona Handbol players
CB Torrevieja players
BM Ciudad Real players
BM Aragón players
HC Dobrogea Sud Constanța players
Expatriate handball players
Spanish expatriate sportspeople in Romania